Benoit Comeau (July 23, 1916 – December 9, 1995) was a Canadian politician. He represented the electoral district of Clare in the Nova Scotia House of Assembly from 1967 to 1981. He was a member of the Nova Scotia Liberal Party.

Early life
Comeau was born in Comeauville, Nova Scotia; his father was former Nova Scotia MLA and Senator, Joseph William Comeau. Benoit Comeau served in World War II with the Royal Canadian Air Force and was a mink rancher.

Political career
Elected in 1967, Comeau served in the Executive Council of Nova Scotia as Minister of Lands and Forests, Minister of Fisheries, and Minister of Public Works. He did not run for reelection in 1981.

Death
He died on December 9, 1995.

He was married to Marie Antoinette Doucet.

References

1916 births
1995 deaths
Acadian people
Members of the Executive Council of Nova Scotia
Nova Scotia Liberal Party MLAs
People from Digby County, Nova Scotia
Royal Canadian Air Force personnel of World War II
Nova Scotia political party leaders